Anthony Davies (born 2 December 1969) is a former Welsh professional snooker player.

Davies started playing snooker aged 12. He made his first century break made aged 15 and his first maximum break aged 17. After winning a number of titles in Wales, in 1991 Davies turned professional. His best performance was at the 1996 European Open, where he reached the quarter-finals. In 2002 he also reached the last 16 of the World Championship. Davies remained in the top 32 in the world rankings for three seasons, peaking at #26, until a disappointing 2003/2004 season in which he failed to win a match. After failing to regain his form, he was relegated from the main tour in 2005, and retired from snooker in 2006.

Since 1998, he has been an official coach for World Snooker. He has established two junior clubs in the South Wales area, helping to increase participation levels and improve playing performance amongst local snooker players. In April 2008 he worked on a pilot scheme, called 'KIS' [Kids Into Snooker], set up by Cuefactor in conjunction with the Paul Hunter Foundation, the aim being to help generate interest in snooker amongst disadvantaged young people.

Davies made a brief return to competitive snooker in 2013, entering the sixth event of the European Tour, the Kay Suzanne Memorial Cup. Having come through the amateur rounds, he then defeated Anthony McGill and Nigel Bond to reach the last 32, where he lost to Joel Walker.

References

Welsh snooker players
1969 births
Living people
Snooker players from Cardiff